Burnt Prairie (formerly known as Liberty) is a village in White County, Illinois, United States. The population was 58 at the 2000 census.

Geography
Burnt Prairie is located at  (38.251335, -88.257641).

Demographics

As of the census of 2000, there were 58 people, 31 households, and 15 families residing in the village. The racial makeup of the village was 100.00% White. Hispanic or Latino of any race were 1.72% of the population.

There were 31 households, out of which 16.1% had children under the age of 18 living with them, 45.2% were married couples living together, 3.2% had a female householder with no husband present, and 48.4% were non-families. 41.9% of all households were made up of individuals, and 32.3% had someone living alone who was 65 years of age or older. The average household size was 1.87 and the average family size was 2.50.

In the village, the population was spread out, with 12.1% under the age of 18, 12.1% from 18 to 24, 20.7% from 25 to 44, 29.3% from 45 to 64, and 25.9% who were 65 years of age or older. The median age was 53 years. For every 100 females, there were 87.1 males. For every 100 females age 18 and over, there were 88.9 males.

The median income for a household in the village was $18,125, and the median income for a family was $23,750. Males had a median income of $33,750 versus $23,750 for females. The per capita income for the village was $14,572. There were 18.2% of families and 28.3% of the population living below the poverty line, including no under eighteens and 33.3% of those over 64.

References

External links
Burnt Prairie Homepage

Villages in Illinois
Villages in White County, Illinois